This is a list of Samurai 7 episodes, an anime series based on Akira Kurosawa's Seven Samurai, but with a steampunk setting. The 26-episode series was directed by Toshifumi Takizawa.

Episode list

References

External links
Story outline, official series homepage (in Japanese)

Samurai 7
Seven Samurai